More Than Friends is an album by the South African musician Jonathan Butler, released in 1988. The title track was released as a single.

The album peaked at No. 113 on the Billboard 200. Butler supported the album by touring with Najee and Angela Bofill.

Production
Butler made it a point to avoid writing about South Africa and its politics. He added elements of hip hop to his sound on More Than Friends; "True Love Never Fails", a duet with Vanessa Bell Armstrong, incorporated gospel influences. Butler didn't feel like he was abandoning jazz so much as becoming more aware of popular music styles. "Sekona" is an instrumental.

Critical reception

The Washington Post opined that Butler "has all but abandoned whatever musical and vocal distinctiveness he once had in favor of his copycat commercial bent." The Austin American-Statesman determined that the music "is upbeat and infectious with a backbeat that overpowers its occasional lapses into formulaic radio fare." The Richmond Times-Dispatch called More Than Friends a "slickly produced album" that "moves toward the pop mainstream."

AllMusic wrote that the album "continued the de-emphasis on his guitar playing, and was his biggest, most lavishly produced set."

Track listing

References

1988 albums
Jive Records albums